Kyau & Albert is the working name for two trance music producers and DJs from Germany named Ralph Kyau and Steven Moebius Albert. They were formerly known as Kyau vs. Albert but changed their working name to Kyau & Albert in 2006.

History
Ralph Kyau had his first experience with the production of electronic music in 1990 and gained a reputation for DJing as well as Live PA sets at several underground techno parties in Germany before releasing his first record "Modulation Experiments" at the end of 1993.

Together with DJ Shandy he founded the label Harmony Recordings in 1993 and they signed the massive Mirco de Govia as their first act. At the same time, Steven Moebius Albert began to produce his own tracks and in the summer of 1994, Ralph and Steven met for the first time.

They produced their first tracks together for a live performance, realized that they have a common perception of music, and decided to try their hands at producing together. The result was their first single "Let me in" released in 1996. From then on they became known under the artist name of Kyau vs Albert. Their two small studios merged and they founded the music production company "Euphonic" in 1997, signing Sonorous aka Rough Mullar as well as Ronski Speed. With such a strong backing of producers, the team began pushing for their sound to be heard.

In 2000, the guise of Kyau vs Albert became recognized by WEA (part of Warner Music) and a long term contract was put together, forming the start of their journey into dance music, with huge support from DJs such as Paul van Dyk, KayCee, Tiësto and many others.

In 2002, Sun Decade (one of Ronski Speed aliases) shined on the Euphonic label with the massive "I'm Alone". The track blew the roof off many house and clubs around the world with its soaring vocals and superb productions, putting Kyau & Albert and their Euphonic label at the top of the list in the industry.

To celebrate 15 years in the industry Kyau & Albert released the album '15 Years' In March 2012, an album of their best tracks remixed by a carefully selected group of contemporary trance artists as well as some of their brand new material.

The duo featured in the annual DJ Magazine Top 100 DJs poll for four consecutive years (2007-2010).

Discography

Studio albums
 2004 Here We Are Now 
 2006 Worldvibe
 2013 Nights Awake
 2015 Distant Lights
 2016 20 Years
 2017 Matching Stories
 2018 Neverlost
 2019 Euphonic 300

DJ mixes
 2003 Kyau vs. Albert – Review 2004 Positive Ways 4 2004 Techno club Next 2 2005 This Is Trance 3 2006 From Euphonic To Russia 2007 Euphonic 10 YearsCompilations
 2008  Euphonic 10 Years 2009  Best Of 2002-2009 2012 15 Years - The AlbumExtended plays
 2018 Neverlost, Part 1 2018 Neverlost, Part 2Singles
 1993 Kyau - Modulation Experiments [Xplode Records]
 1994 Kyau - Overflyer [Harmony Records]
 1994 Kyau - House Will [Harmony Records]
 1996 Kyau vs. Albert - Let Me In [Harmony Records]
 1997 Kyau vs. Albert - Rocket [Happy Vibes Records]
 1998 Kyau vs. Albert - Let Me In (The Mixes) [Euphonic]
 1998 Kyau vs. Albert - Lovemassacre [Euphonic]
 1999 Moebius AG - Do What I Want [Rouge Pulp]
 2000 Kyau vs. Albert - Great / Loebau [Euphonic]
 2000 Kyau vs. Albert - LFO [Euphonic]
 2000 Kyau vs. Albert - Euphonic [Euphonic]
 2001 Kyau vs. Albert - Outside [WEA]
 2001 Moebius AG - Come on Girl [ZYX Germany]
 2002 Kyau vs. Albert - Save Me [WEA]
 2003 Kyau vs. Albert - Velvet Morning [Euphonic]
 2004 Kyau vs. Albert - Made Of Sun [Euphonic]
 2004 Kyau vs. Albert Feat Julie - Not with You [Euphonic]
 2006 Kyau vs. Albert - Kiksu [Euphonic]
 2006 Kyau vs. Albert - Walk Down [Euphonic]
 2006 Kyau vs. Albert - Are You Fine? [Euphonic]
 2007 Kyau & Albert - Always a Fool [Euphonic]
 2007 Kyau & Albert - Megashira [Euphonic]
 2007 Kyau & Albert - 7Skies [Euphonic]
 2008 Kyau & Albert with Marc Marberg - Orange Bill / Neo Love [EUPHORiC]
 2008 Kyau & Albert - Hide & Seek [Euphonic]
 2009 Kyau & Albert - Be There 4 U/Hooked On Infinity [Euphonic]
 2009 Kyau & Albert with Marc Marberg - Grrreat [Euphonic]
 2009 Kyau & Albert - I Love You [Euphonic]
 2010 Kyau & Albert - Once in A Life (Release TBA!)
 2010 Kyau & Albert - Painkillers [Euphonic]
 2010 Kyau & Albert vs. Above & Beyond - Anphonic [Anjunabeats]
 2011 Kyau & Albert - Barbizon [Euphonic]
 2011 Kyau & Albert - On The Way [Euphonic], inspired by The U Movie film trailer
 2011 Kyau & Albert - A Night like This [Euphonic]
 2011 Kyau & Albert - 15 Years: Part One [Euphonic]
 2011 Kyau & Albert - 15 Years: Part Two [Euphonic]
 2011 Kyau & Albert - 15 Years: Part Three [Euphonic]
 2011 Kyau & Albert - 15 Years: Part Four [Euphonic]
 2011 Kyau & Albert - 15 Years: Part Five [Euphonic]
 2012 Kyau & Albert - 15 Years: Part Six [Euphonic]
 2012 Kyau & Albert - This Love [Euphonic]
 2012 Marc Marberg with Kyau & Albert – Robotron [Euphonic]
 2012 Kyau & Albert With Ronski Speed – Euphonia [Euphonic]
 2012 Kyau & Albert - Another Time [Euphonic]
 2012 Kyau & Albert - Glühwürmchen [Anjunabeats]
 2013 Kyau & Albert - The One [Euphonic]
 2013 Kyau & Albert With Stoneface & Terminal – We Own The Night  [Euphonic]
 2013 Kyau & Albert – All Your Colours [Euphonic]
 2014 Kyau & Albert - Are You One of Us? [Euphonic]
 2014 Kyau & Albert - Down [Euphonic]
 2014 Kyau & Albert - Relevant Angel [Euphonic]
 2014 Kyau & Albert - Nights Awake Remixes EP Part 1 [Euphonic]
 2014 Kyau & Albert - Nights Awake Remixes EP Part 2 [Euphonic]
 2015 Kyau & Albert - Follow The Waves [Euphonic]
 2015 Kyau & Albert - Lover In The Dark [Euphonic]
 2015 Kyau & Albert featuring Maria Nayler - Calming Rain [Euphonic]
 2016 Kyau & Albert - About The Sun [Anjunabeats]
 2016 Kyau & Albert - Memory Lane [Anjunabeats]
 2016 Kyau & Albert – 20 Years (EP # 1) [Euphonic]
 2016 Kyau & Albert – Sleeping Lions (Feat. In Gray) [Anjunabeats]
 2017 Kyau & Albert - Trace [Euphonic]
 2017 Kyau & Albert - Mein Herz [Euphonic]
 2018 Kyau & Albert vs. Genix - Mantis [Anjunabeats]
 2018 Kyau & Albert - Tube Hearts [Anjunabeats]
 2018 Kyau & Albert with Steve Brian - Reverie [Euphonic]
 2019 Kyau & Albert with Aly & Fila - Come Home [FSOE]
 2019 Kyau & Albert - You Are All [Anjunabeats]
 2019 Kyau & Albert - So True [Euphonic]
 2020 Kyau & Albert - What It Takes [Euphonic]
 2020 Kyau & Albert and Steve Brian - Candy [Euphonic]
 2020 Kyau & Albert - Shimmer [Euphonic]
 2020 Kyau & Albert - Beehive / Paper Towns [Anjunabeats]
 2021 Kyau & Albert - Spüren [Euphonic]
 2022 Kyau & Albert - Hearts Will Burn [Anjunabeats]

Remixes
 1994 Mirco de Govia - Sumatra Rain
 1997 DJ Happy Vibes - Wake Up
 1997 Underground Children
 1998 Spacewalker - Baywatch
 1998 Elastique V - Cara Mia
 2000 Sonorous - Glass Garden
 2000 Taiko - Echo Drop
 2001 Delicate - Close Your Eyes
 2001 Elektrostar - Tides of Memories
 2001 Flesh & Bones - Rigor Mortis
 2001 KayCee - I feel You
 2001 Kosheen - Catch
 2001 Mirco de Govia - Epic Monolith
 2002 Apoptygma Berzerk - Suffer in Silence
 2002 David Forbes - Questions (Must be Asked)
 2002 Mirco de Govia - Thing's That Matter
 2002 Solid Sessions - Janeiro
 2004 Young Parisians feat. Ben Lost - Jump The Next Train
 2004 Blank & Jones - Waiting For The Light
 2005 Ridgewalkers feat. EL - Find
 2006 Oceanlab - Sirens of the sea
 2006 Schiller mit Jette von Roth - Der Tag...Du Bist erwacht
 2006 Gabriel & Dresden - Tracking Treasure Down
 2007 Ronski Speed - Love All The Pain Away
 2007 Cinema Bizarre - Lovesongs
 2007 Sebastian Sand - Strange Bends
 2008 Cressida - 6a.m.
 2008 Paul van Dyk feat. Ashley Tomberlin - Complicated
 2008 Lange feat. Sarah Howells - Out of the Sky
 2009 Cosmic Gate - Flatline
 2009 Stoneface and Terminal - Santiago
 2010 Bent - As You Fall
 2010 Super8 & Tab - Empire
 2011 Armin van Buuren ft Ana Criado - Down To Love
 2011 Kyau & Albert - Kiksu
 2011 Ferry Corsten - Check It Out
 2011 Above & Beyond featuring Zoë Johnston - You Got To Go
 2012 Ronski Speed and Stine Grove - Run To The Sunlight
 2018 Tritonal featuring Lourdiz - "Love U Right" (Kyau & Albert Remix)
 2019 Kast - "Pager"

Facts
Velvet Morning has been remixed by Mirco De Govia,  and Super8 & Tab. In 2016, a remix by Genix was released in their 20 Years (EP # 1) marking 20 years of the duo.  

Kyau & Albert host a monthly radio show called Euphonic Sessions, which is broadcast on the Internet radio station AH.FM and then later re-broadcast on other stations. The Podcast of Euphonic Sessions'' can be found on the iTunes (US) directory here.

References

External links
 
 
 
 
 TranceSound interview, September 2010

German DJs
German electronic music groups
German dance music groups
German trance music groups
German musical duos
Electronic dance music DJs
Electronic dance music duos
Anjunabeats artists
Musical groups established in 1990